Luke Saville and Jordan Thompson were the defending champions but only Saville chose to defend his title, partnering Jarryd Chaplin. Saville lost in the quarterfinals to Tom Jomby and Eric Quigley.

Alex Bolt and Max Purcell won the title after defeating Jomby and Quigley 7–5, 6–4 in the final.

Seeds

Draw

References
 Main Draw

Kentucky Bank Tennis Championships - Men's Doubles
2017 Men's Doubles